Olivancillaria vesica is a species of sea snail, a marine gastropod mollusk in the family Olividae, the olives.

Description

Distribution
O. vesica can be found in the waters off Brazil, Uruguay and Argentina.

References

External links

Olividae
Gastropods described in 1791